Riitta Maija Vainionpää (3 October 1952 – 24 April 2021) was a Finnish-Swedish textile artist.

Biography
Vainionpää has been awarded several scholarships and was chosen Artist of the Year 2011 by the Swedish-Finnish art association Suomiart.

Vainionpää's work has been displayed in galleries throughout Sweden, in exhibitions such as "" at Liljevalchs konsthall in 2011, and "" at the Röhsska Museum in 2015/2016.

Vainionpää died on 24 April 2021, in Stockholm, from COVID-19. She was 68 years old.

References

20th-century Swedish artists
21st-century Swedish artists
Swedish textile artists
Swedish women artists
1952 births
2021 deaths
Swedish people of Finnish descent
Finnish emigrants to Sweden
Aalto University School of Arts, Design and Architecture alumni
Artists from Stockholm
Deaths from the COVID-19 pandemic in Sweden